Maurice Canady (born May 26, 1994) is an American football cornerback who is a free agent. He played college football at Virginia.

Professional career

Baltimore Ravens
Canady was drafted by the Baltimore Ravens in the sixth round, 209th overall, in the 2016 NFL Draft. He was placed on injured reserve on October 6, 2016 with a hamstring injury.

On September 4, 2017, Canady was placed on injured reserve due to a knee injury suffered in training camp. He was activated off injured reserve to the active roster on November 3, 2017.

On September 17, 2018, Canady was placed on injured reserve with a thigh injury. He was activated off injured reserve on November 24, 2018.

On August 31, 2019, Canady was waived by the Ravens and was signed to the practice squad the next day. He was promoted to the active roster on September 14, 2019.
In week 4 against the Cleveland Browns, Canady recorded his first career interception off Baker Mayfield in the 40–25 loss. He was released on November 5.

New York Jets
On November 6, 2019, Canady was claimed off waivers by the New York Jets.

Dallas Cowboys
Canady signed with the Dallas Cowboys on March 30, 2020. On July 27, 2020, Canady opted out of the 2020 season due to the COVID-19 pandemic.

Canady was placed on injured reserve on October 26, 2021 after suffering a concussion in Week 6. He was activated on December 25.

New York Giants
On May 18, 2022, Canady signed with the New York Giants. On July 26, 2022, Canady was waived.

NFL career statistics

References

External links
Virginia Cavaliers bio

1994 births
Living people
American football cornerbacks
Players of American football from Richmond, Virginia
Virginia Cavaliers football players
Baltimore Ravens players
New York Jets players
Dallas Cowboys players
New York Giants players